Wings University Tour was an impromptu UK concert tour by Paul McCartney & Wings in 1972, shortly after the band's formation and initial album release, Wild Life. Wings' lineup for the tour was Paul and Linda McCartney, Denny Laine, Henry McCullough, and Denny Seiwell.

Background
McCartney had formed Wings for the purpose of having a band to go on the road with again, and he wasted no time in doing just that. During the waning years of The Beatles, notably during the Get Back sessions, he had suggested they return to live performances by showing up unannounced at pubs and playing for the patrons, but the idea was never seriously considered by the other Beatles. From 2 to 7 February 1972, Wings held rehearsals for the tour at London's Institute of Contemporary Arts (ICA). The rehearsals were filmed by Tyncho Films, and titled by McCartney as The ICA Rehearsal, and features footage of: "The Mess", "Wild Life", "Bip Bop", "Blue Moon of Kentucky", "Maybellene", "Seaside Woman", "My Love", "Give Ireland Back to the Irish" and "Lucille". A short excerpt of the footage was included in the TV documentary Wings Over the World.

Locations, fee
McCartney took the band on an impromptu tour of the United Kingdom's universities. Beginning on 9 February Wings would arrive—often unannounced—at destinations McCartney would later refer to in the 2001 documentary Wingspan as venues which simply "sounded [interesting]" to the band, and would subsequently perform live for whoever happened to be on campus on the date of their arrival. He would later reflect on the mechanisms and motives of this tour as being a phase in the construction of the band he had formed, stating: "For me, it was like building the whole thing from square one."

The band's intended first stop on the tour, Ashby de la Zouch, had no suitable venue, so the band moved on to the more receptive Nottingham, with Paul performing his first paying concert since 1966. Admission to the first show which was held at 12 noon in the Portland Building Ballroom was GBP 0.40, proceeds being split up equally among the band members.  At Hull, the word circulated fast, and a full hall of about 800 welcomed Wings at 50p per head. At Leeds (50p) the gig had a generator on standby as a precaution against the powercuts due to the miners strike.

Tour dates

Set list

References

Wings (band) concert tours
1972 concert tours
1972 in the United Kingdom
Concert tours of the United Kingdom
Universities in the United Kingdom